The Minister of State at the Department of Finance is a junior ministerial post in the Department of Finance of the Government of Ireland. A Minister of State does not hold cabinet rank. The position was created on 1 January 1978, replacing the position of Parliamentary Secretary to the Minister for Finance.

The current Minister of State is Jennifer Carroll MacNeill, TD, who was appointed in December 2022.

List of office-holders

References

Finance
Public finance of Ireland
Department of Finance (Ireland)